Viktor Petrovich Kravchenko (born 15 May 1941) is a retired Russian triple jumper who won a bronze medal at the 1964 Olympics with his all-time best jump of 16.57 m. Domestically Kravchenko won a Soviet title in 1964 and 1966, and finished second in 1967.

References

1941 births
Living people
Soviet male triple jumpers
Olympic bronze medalists for the Soviet Union
Athletes (track and field) at the 1964 Summer Olympics
Olympic athletes of the Soviet Union
Dynamo sports society athletes
Medalists at the 1964 Summer Olympics
Olympic bronze medalists in athletics (track and field)